David Thomas (bardic name Dewi Hefin) (4 June 1828 – 9 March 1909) was a Welsh poet and teacher.

Life
Thomas was born in Llanwenog, Cardiganshire, south Wales. He went to school in Cribyn and later ran schools in various places in Cardiganshire (Cribyn, Bwlch-y-fafda, Mydroilyn, Llanarth, Cwrtnewydd and Llanwnnen) until his retirement in 1883. His pupils in Cribyn included John Islan Jones, who went on to become a distinguished Unitarian minister and writer.

References

1828 births
1909 deaths
Welsh schoolteachers
19th-century Welsh poets